A Year in the Life is an American dramatic series that began as a three-part miniseries which was first broadcast in December 1986 and later ran on NBC from September 16, 1987 to April 13, 1988, during the 1987–1988 television season. It was created by Joshua Brand and John Falsey.

As suggested by the title, the miniseries followed the various members of the Gardner family of Seattle during the course of one year. The major event of that year was the sudden and unexpected death of wife and mother Ruth Gardner (Eva Marie Saint). Following the success of the miniseries, NBC decided to launch a one-hour drama series the following fall. 

Richard Kiley played Joe Gardner, owner of a successful plastics business and father of four adult children. The children were twice-divorced daughter Anne (Wendy Phillips), who had returned home with her two teenaged children; daughter Lindley (Jayne Atkinson) and husband Jim (Adam Arkin), parents of a newborn baby daughter; black sheep son Jack (Morgan Stevens); and conservative youngest son Sam (David Oliver), married to free-spirited Kay (Sarah Jessica Parker). Diana Muldaur was a later addition to the cast as Dr. Alice Foley, Joe Gardner's new romantic interest. Amanda Peterson played Joe Gardner's granddaughter Sunny Sisk and Trey Ames played Gardner's grandson, David Sisk.

The miniseries was the third-highest rated miniseries of the 1986–87 US television season with a 16.9/27 rating/share.

The series ran for one complete season, but brought in low ratings and was not renewed for a second season, ranking 63rd with an average 11.9 rating.

Cast 
Richard Kiley as Joe Gardner
Eva Marie Saint as Ruth Gardner (although the family matriarch, she only appears in the first episode of the miniseries)
Wendy Phillips as Anne Gardner Maxwell
Jayne Atkinson as Lindley Gardner Eisenberg
Adam Arkin as Jim Eisenberg
Morgan Stevens as Jack Gardner
David Oliver as Sam Gardner
Sarah Jessica Parker as Kay Ericson Gardner
Diana Muldaur as Dr. Alice Foley
Amanda Peterson as Sunny Sisk
Trey Ames as David Sisk

Episodes

Miniseries (1986)

Series

References

External links
 
 

1987 American television series debuts
1988 American television series endings
1980s American television miniseries
1980s American drama television series
NBC original programming
Television shows set in Seattle
Television series by Universal Television
Primetime Emmy Award for Outstanding Miniseries winners
English-language television shows
Television series created by Joshua Brand
Television series created by John Falsey